Bukówko  (German: Neu Buckow) is a village in the administrative district of Gmina Tychowo, within Białogard County, West Pomeranian Voivodeship, in north-western Poland.

The village has a population of 320.

References

Villages in Białogard County